Fat Kwong Street is a street in Ho Man Tin and Hung Hom, Kowloon, Hong Kong.

History
Fat Kwong Street was originally a short street in Hung Hom. To facilitate this scheme, a flyover was built over Princess Margaret Road at a cost of around HK$2.1 million, which was completed in 1970. The new road link was constructed, in part, to serve major government housing developments in the No. 12 Hill and Quarry Hill areas, including Oi Man Estate and Ho Man Tin Estate.

The eastern part of Fat Kwong Street was closed in September 1970 due to landslides. Major repairs were required, and the street did not reopen until June 1971.

Description
It is classified by the Hong Kong Government as a district distributor road.

Intersecting roads
West to east:
 
 
 Sheung Foo Street
 Sheung Lok Street
 Yan Fung Street
 Shun Yung Street
 Chatham Road North (Route 5)​ (over a flyover)
 Wo Chung Street
 Ping Chi Street
 Ma Tau Wai Road (over a flyover)
 Man Yue Street
 Man Lok Street
 
 Tai Wan Road East

References

Ho Man Tin
Lo Lung Hang
Roads in Kowloon